The Edge Radio 101.5 (DXCD 101.5 MHz) is an FM station owned and operated by Christian Music Power. Its studios and transmitter are located at Purok 2, Brgy. Balindog, Kidapawan.

References

External links
The Edge Radio Kidapawan FB Page
The Edge Radio Kidapawan Website

Radio stations in Cotabato
Christian radio stations in the Philippines
Radio stations established in 2010